Yasumitsu Kanehama (born 2 June 1963) is a Japanese speed skater. He competed in two events at the 1988 Winter Olympics.

References

1963 births
Living people
Japanese male speed skaters
Olympic speed skaters of Japan
Speed skaters at the 1988 Winter Olympics
Sportspeople from Aomori Prefecture